The Zhìyuán fǎbǎo kāntòng lù is a catalog of over 1,400 of Chinese Buddhist translations from Sanskrit which indicates the corresponding Tibetan and Sanskrit titles when available.  The catalog was first published in 1289.

References

Chinese Buddhist texts